ISO 3166-2:HR is the entry for Croatia in ISO 3166-2, part of the ISO 3166 standard published by the International Organization for Standardization (ISO), which defines codes for the names of the principal subdivisions (e.g., provinces or states) of all countries coded in ISO 3166-1.

Currently for Croatia, ISO 3166-2 codes are defined for 1 city and 20 counties. The city Zagreb is the capital of the country and has special status equal to the counties.

Each code consists of two parts, separated by a hyphen. The second part is two digits:
 01–20: counties
 21: city

Current codes
Subdivision names are listed as in the ISO 3166-2 standard published by the ISO 3166 Maintenance Agency (ISO 3166/MA).

Subdivision names are sorted in Croatian alphabetical order: a-c, č, ć, d, dž, đ, e-l, lj, m-n, nj, o-s, š, t-z, ž.

Click on the button in the header to sort each column.

 Notes

Changes
The following changes to the entry have been announced in newsletters by the ISO 3166/MA since the first publication of ISO 3166-2 in 1998:

See also
 Administrative divisions of Croatia
 FIPS region codes of Croatia
 NUTS codes of Croatia

External links
 ISO Online Browsing Platform: HR
 Counties of Croatia, Statoids.com

2:HR
ISO 3166-2
Croatia geography-related lists